Yordanis Despaigne Herrera (born  February 12, 1980) is a Cuban professional boxer who, as an amateur boxer, has medaled repeatedly in international tournaments as a middleweight.

Career
In Belfast at the 2001 World Amateur Boxing Championships he won a Bronze medal. After beating Kenneth Egan he lost to Utkirbek Haydarov (UZB) 28-29.

In Bangkok 2003 he easily beat Haydarov 33:13 but lost to eventual winner Gennady Golovkin 26:29 and got another Bronze.

At the PanAm Games 2003 he edged out American southpaw Andre Dirrell 21:20 but was upset in the final by Dominican Juan Ubaldo.

At the Olympics 2004 he beat Haitian-Canadian Jean Pascal and Hungarian Károly Balzsay but lost 11:12 against Andre Dirrell.

2005 he lost in an early round at the national championships but in 2006 he beat the young champion Emilio Correa and regained the Cuban championships. He also won the 2006 Central American and Caribbean Games beating among others Argenis Casimiro Núñez in the first round.

Despaigne moved up a division and reached the final of the national championships 2008 where he was upset by 18-year-old Julio Cesar La Cruz from Camagüey.

World Cup
2005 in Moscow, Russia (middleweight)
Defeated Suriya Prasathinphimai (Thailand) 28–11
Defeated Ronald Gavril (Romania) RSC-3
Lost to Gennady Golovkin (Kazakhstan) 37–40
Lost to Matvey Korobov (Russia) 39–53

Professional career
Despaigne defected to the United States along with fellow celebrated Cuban boxers Guillermo Rigondeaux and Yudel Johnson in the spring of 2009 and made his professional debut on May 22, 2009.

External links

World Championships 2001
W.C.2003 results
PanAm 2003
Central American Games 2006
Dirrell fight 2004

Living people
1980 births
Middleweight boxers
Boxers at the 2003 Pan American Games
Olympic boxers of Cuba
Boxers at the 2004 Summer Olympics
Cuban male boxers
AIBA World Boxing Championships medalists
Pan American Games silver medalists for Cuba
Pan American Games medalists in boxing
Central American and Caribbean Games gold medalists for Cuba
Competitors at the 2006 Central American and Caribbean Games
Central American and Caribbean Games medalists in boxing
Medalists at the 2003 Pan American Games
21st-century Cuban people